Louise Caire Clark (born 1949) is a retired American actress.

Life and career
Clark was born in Santa Monica, California in 1949 and moved back to her mother's home in New Orleans in 1950.  Her mother, Audrey Caire, was a National AAU Champion and an actress and model.  Her father, William Doran Clark, a decorated hero of the Korean War, was the son of General Mark Wayne Clark.  When Clark was age 5, the family moved back to Los Angeles, California. In her early years, her mother was a contract player at 20th Century Fox and she was exposed to the film industry.  Her mentor was George Cukor who arranged for speech and voice lessons.

At age 15, the family moved to New York where Clark developed an interest in acting. After graduating from college, she attended and graduated from the Neighborhood Playhouse in New York City, studying under Sanford Meisner.  She went on to attend the Actors Studio, studying with Lee Strasberg.

Clark married Peter Gries in 1974, son of the film director Tom Gries, and moved back to California. She did not enjoy acting in California.  She and her husband started a small production company and had two sons, Mathew, born in 1976 and Michael, born in 1980. Clark and her husband eventually divorced.

In 1983, at age 34, Clark decided to go back to work as an actress. Her first audition was for Disney Cable's then upcoming TV series, Five Mile Creek which was to be filmed in Australia.  She was given the role and relocated. She remained in Australia for two years until the show was cancelled.  In 1985, she returned to the United States with her two sons.

Clark has acted sporadically in smaller roles in film and television and has also appeared in over 300 television commercials. Her sister is the actress Doran Clark, married to the producer Peter Abrams.

Clark later married Ben Goddard, who wrote and produced the "Harry and Louise" advertisements, in which she played Louise, paid for by private health insurance companies to help defeat the Clinton health care plan of 1993. In 2000, they produced the movie The Testimony of Taliesin Jones. Goddard died 15 June, 2018.

Filmography
Actress
Get Christie Love! (1974)  1 episode (Karen Clark)
The Catamount Killing (1974) (Iris Loring)
Helter Skelter (1976) TV
She's Dressed to Kill (1979) TV
Five Mile Creek (1983–1985) TV - 39 Episodes, 3 Seasons (Maggie Scott)
Hardcastle and McCormick (1985) TV - Season 3, Episode 12
Cobra (1986) woman in car
Matlock (1987) TV - 1 episode  (Jesse Peters)
Stingray (1987) TV - 1 episode  (Autumn)
Programmed to Kill (1987) film  (Sharon - A.K.A. "The Retaliator")
Head of the Class (1990) TV - 1 episode (Joanna)
Producer
The Testimony of Taliesin Jones (2000) film

References

External links

2002 Five Mile Creek Fan Club interview

1949 births
American film actresses
American television actresses
Living people
21st-century American women